Hanan may refer to:

Hanan (given name)
Hanan (surname)
 Hanan International Airport, Niue

See also 
 Hamam (disambiguation)
 Haman (disambiguation)
 Baal-hanan
 Hannan (disambiguation)